Vatansever Şaşmaz (8 January 1975, Fatih, Istanbul – 27 August 2017, Istanbul), Turkish actor, and author.

Early life 
He is originally from Biga, Çanakkale. He was given the name "Homeland" by his mother because he was born on Istanbul Vatan Street. He was a photo model in his youth. He has also appeared in some commercials and clips. He has presented morning programs at ATV with Melike Öcalan for years.

Death 
On 27 August 2017, he was shot and killed at the age of 42 by former model and actor Filiz Aker in a hotel in Istanbul.

References

1975 births
2017 deaths
Male actors from Istanbul
Turkish male film actors
Turkish male television actors
Turkish television presenters
Deaths by firearm in Turkey
People murdered in Turkey